This is a list of ethnic riots by country, and includes riots based on ethnic, sectarian, xenophobic, and racial conflict. Some of these riots can also be classified as pogroms.

Africa

Americas

United States

Nativist period: 1700s–1860 

 1824: Providence, RI – Hard Scrabble Riots
 1829: Cincinnati, OH – Cincinnati riots of 1829
 1829: Charlestown, Massachusetts – anti-Catholic Riots
 1831: Providence, RI
 1834: Massachusetts – Convent burning
 1834: Philadelphia, PA – pro-slavery riots
 1834: New York, NY – New York City pro-slavery riots
 1835: Boston, MA – pro-slavery riots
 1835: Five Points Riot
 1835: Washington, D.C. – Snow Riot
 1836: Cincinnati, OH – Cincinnati riots of 1836
 1841: Cincinnati, OH – White Irish-descendant and Irish immigrant dock workers rioted against Black dock workers.
 1844: Philadelphia, PA – Philadelphia Nativist Riots
 1851: Hoboken, NJ – anti-German riot
 1855: Louisville, KY – anti-German riots

Civil War period: 1861–1865

Reconstruction era: 1865–1877 

 1866: New Orleans massacre of 1866
 1866: Memphis, Tennessee, mostly ethnic Irish against African Americans
 1868: Pulaski Riot
 1868: St. Bernard Parish massacre, St. Bernard Parish, Louisiana, whites against blacks
 1868: Opelousas massacre, Opelousas, Louisiana, whites against blacks
 1868: Camilla massacre, Camilla, Georgia, whites against blacks
 1870: Eutaw massacre, Eutaw, Alabama, whites against blacks
 1870: Laurens, South Carolina
 1870: New York City Orange Riot
 1871: Second New York City Orange Riot
 1871: Los Angeles, Chinese massacre. Mixed Mexican and white mob killed 17–20 Chinese in the largest mass lynching in U.S. history
 1871: Meridian race riot of 1871, Meridian, Mississippi, whites against African Americans
 1891: New Orleans, lynchings of Italians and riot 
 1873: Colfax massacre, white Democrats against black Republicans
 1874: Vicksburg, Mississippi
 1874: New Orleans, Louisiana (Battle of Liberty Place) After contested gubernatorial election, Democrats took over state buildings for three days
 1874: Coushatta massacre, Coushatta, Louisiana, white Democrats against black Republicans
 1875: Yazoo City, Mississippi
 1875: Clinton, Mississippi
 1876: Hamburg Massacre
 1876: Ellenton riot, Ellenton, South Carolina

Jim Crow era: 1878–1914 

 1885: Rock Springs, WY – Anti-Chinese riot
 1886: Seattle, WA – Seattle riot of 1886
 1889: Forrest City, AR – 1889 Forrest City riot
 1891: New Orleans, LA – March 14, 1891 New Orleans lynchings
 1898: North Carolina – Wilmington Insurrection of 1898 (white Democrats overthrew elected government and attacked Blacks)
 1898: Lake City, SC – Lynching of Frazier B. Baker and Julia Baker
 1898: Greenwood County, SC – Phoenix election riot
 1900: New Orleans, LA – Robert Charles riots
 1900: Manhattan, NY – Tenderloin anti-Black mob and police riot
 1904: Springfield, OH – Springfield race riot of 1904
 1906: Springfield, OH – Springfield race riot of 1906
 1906: Atlanta, GA – Atlanta Massacre of 1906 (whites against African Americans)
 1906: Brownsville, TX – Brownsville affair
 1907: Onancock, VA
 1907: San Francisco, CA and Bellingham, WA – Pacific Coast race riots of 1907 (anti-Asian)
 1908: Springfield, IL – Springfield race riot of 1908
 1909: Omaha, NE – Greek Town riot
 1910: Nationwide – Johnson–Jeffries riots (anti-black riots following the heavyweight championship victory of Jack Johnson against Jim Jeffries)
 1910: Slocum, TX – Slocum massacre

War and interwar period: 1914–1945 

 1917: East St. Louis, IL – East St. Louis riots
 1917: Chester, PA – 1917 Chester race riot
 1917: Philadelphia, PA
 1917: El Paso, TX – 1917 Bath riots
 1917: Houston, TX – Houston riot
 1919: Red Summer
 Washington, D.C.
 Chicago race riot of 1919
 Omaha race riot of 1919
 Charleston riot of 1919
 Longview race riot
 Knoxville riot of 1919
 Elaine Race Riot
 1920: Ocoee, FL – Ocoee Massacre
 1921: Tulsa, OK – Tulsa race massacre
 1921: Springfield, OH – Springfield race riot of 1921
 1923: Rosewood, FL – Rosewood massacre
 1927: Yakima Valley, WA – Yakima Valley riots (anti-Filipino)
 1928: Wenatchee Valley – Wenatchee Valley anti-Filipino riot
 1929: Exeter, CA – Exeter anti-Filipino riot
 1930: Watsonville, CA – Watsonville riots (anti-Filipino riot that inspired further riots and attacks in San Francisco, Salinas, San Jose, and elsewhere).
 1935: New York, NY – Harlem riot of 1935
 1943: Detroit, MI – Detroit race riot
 1943: Beaumont, TX – Beaumont race riot of 1943
 1943: New York, NY – Harlem riot of 1943
 1943: Los Angeles, CA – Zoot Suit Riots (white against Mexican Americans and other Zoot suit wearers)
 1944: Agana, Guam – Agana race riot

Postwar era: 1946–1954 
 1946: Airport Homes race riots (series) Airport Homes race riots
 1946: Columbia, TN – Columbia race riot of 1946
 1949: Cortlandt Manor, NY – Peekskill riots (anti-communist race riots against Jews and African Americans)
 1951: Cicero, IL – Cicero race riot

Civil rights and Black Power period: 1955–1977 

 1958: Maxton, NC – Battle of Hayes Pond
 1962: Oxford, MS – Ole Miss riot
 1963: Birmingham, AL – Birmingham Riot of 1963
 1963: Cambridge, MD – Cambridge riot of 1963
 1963: Lexington, NC – Lexington riot
 1964: Harlem, NY – Harlem Riot of 1964
 1964: Rochester, NY – Rochester riot
 1964: North Philadelphia, PA – Philadelphia 1964 race riot
 1965: Los Angeles, CA – Watts Riots
 1966: Humboldt Park, Chicago, IL – Division Street riots
 1966: Cleveland, OH – Hough Riots
 1966: Omaha, NE – North Omaha summer riots
 1966: Dayton, Ohio – 1966 Dayton race riot
 1967: Long Hot Summer of 1967
 June 2: Boston riot (Boston, MA)
 June 11 – 14: Tampa riot (Tampa, FL)
 June 12 – June 15: Cincinnati riot (Cincinnati, OH)
 June 17: Atlanta riot (Atlanta, GA)
 June 26 – July 1: Buffalo riot (Buffalo, NY)
 July 12 – 17: Newark riots (Newark, NJ)
 July 14 – 16: Plainfield riots (Plainsfield, NJ)
 July 17: Cairo riot (Cairo, IL)
 July 20 – 21: Minneapolis riot (Minneapolis, MN)
 July 23 – 25: Toledo riot (Toledo, OH)
 July 23 – 28: Detroit riot (Detroit, MI)
 July 24: Cambridge riot (Cambridge, MD)
 July 26: Saginaw riot (Saginaw, MI)
 July 30: Albina riot (Portland, OR)
 July 30 – August 3: Milwaukee riot (Milwaukee, WI)
 1968: Protests of 1968
 Orangeburg massacre (Orangeburg, SC)
 1968: King-assassination riots (riots following the assassination of Martin Luther King Jr.)
 Baltimore riot of 1968 (Baltimore, MD)
 Chicago West Side riots (Chicago, IL)
 Louisville riots of 1968 (Louisville, KY)
 1968 Washington, D.C. riots (Washington, D.C.)
 1968 Wilmington riots (Wilmington, DE)
 1968: Cleveland, OH – Glenville shootout and riot
 1969: York, PA – 1969 York Race Riot
 1969: New York, NY – Stonewall Riot
 1970: Augusta, GA – May 11 Race Riot
 1970: Jackson, MS – Jackson State killings
 1971: Camden, NJ – Camden riots
 1972–1977: Pensacola, FL – Escambia High School riots
 1972: Coast of North Vietnam – USS Kitty Hawk Riot (October 12–13)
 1975: Ontario, CA – Chaffey High School race riot enhanced by local sniper

1978 to today 

 1978: Houston, TX – Moody Park Riot (on the first anniversary of Joe Campos Torres' death).
 1979: Worcester, MA – Great Brook Valley Projects Riots (Puerto Ricans rioted)
 1980: Miami, FL – Miami riots (riots in reaction to the acquittal of four Miami-Dade Police officers in the death of Arthur McDuffie).
 1980: Chattanooga, TN – Chattanooga riot
 1984: Lawrence, MA – Lawrence race riot (a small scale riot centered at the intersection of Haverhill and railroad streets between working class whites and Hispanics; several buildings were destroyed by Molotov cocktails; August 8, 1984).
 1989: Miami, FL – Overtown riot (two nights of rioting by residents after a black motorcyclist was shot by a Hispanic police officer in the predominantly black community of Overtown. The officer was later convicted of manslaughter).
 1990: Miami, FL – Wynwood riot (Puerto Ricans rioted after a jury acquitted six officers accused of beating a Puerto Rican drug dealer to death)
 1991: Brooklyn, New York, NY – Crown Heights riot (black anti-Jewish mob killed 2, injured 190).
 1992: Los Angeles, CA – Los Angeles riots (riots in reaction to the acquittal of all four LAPD officers involved in the videotaped beating of Rodney King, in addition to the Korean involved in the murder of Latasha Harlins; riots broke out mainly involving black and Latino youths in the black neighborhoods of South Central LA and in the neighborhood of Koreatown before spreading to the rest of the city)
 1996: St. Petersburg, FL – St. Petersburg riots (2-day riots that broke out after 18-year-old Tyron Lewis was fatally shot by Officer Jim Knight, who stopped Lewis for speeding and claimed to have accidentally fire his weapon).
 2001: Cincinnati, OH – Cincinnati riots (riots in a reaction to the fatal shooting of an unarmed young black male, Timothy Thomas by Cincinnati police officer Steven Roach).
 2003: Benton Harbor, MI – Benton Harbor riots
 2005: Toledo, OH – 2005 Toledo riot (a race riot that broke out after a planned Neo-Nazi protest march through a black neighborhood).
 2006: Fontana, CA – Fontana High School riot (riot involving about 500 Latino and black students)
 2006: California – Prison race riots (a series of riots across California set off by a war between Latino and black prison gangs)
 2008: Los Angeles, CA – Locke High School riot
 2009: Oakland, CA – 2009 Oakland riots (peaceful protests turned into rioting after the fatal shooting of Oscar Grant, an unarmed black man, by a BART transit policeman).
 2014–2015: Ferguson, MO – The Ferguson unrest (a series of riots that broke out over the shooting of Michael Brown).
 2014 August: riots for two weeks after the initial shooting of Brown.
 2014 November – December: riots for one week after the police officer who shot Brown was not indicted.
 2015 August: riots for two days during the anniversary of Brown's shooting.
 2015: Baltimore, MD – 2015 Baltimore riots (protests-turned-riots following the death of Freddie Gray, an incident in which a suspect died in police custody)
 2016: Salt Lake City, UT – Riots sparked by the shooting of Abdullahi Omar Mohamed.
 2020: Nationwide – 2020 riots (protests-turned-riots that broke out across the US following the murder of George Floyd).

Asia

Europe

Oceania

See also 
 Anti-Armenianism
 Antisemitism
 List of ethnic cleansing campaigns
 Ethnic conflict
 Ethnic cleansing
 Ethnic conflicts in the Soviet Union
 Ethnic hatred
 Ethnic nationalism
 Ethnocide
 Ethnocracy
 Genocide
 Indophobia
 List of riots
 List of ethnic slurs
 List of ethnic slurs by ethnicity
 Pogrom
 Sinophobia
 Territorial nationalism
 Violence
 Xenophobia in South Africa

References

Ethnic